William Alfred Compton (5 April 1896 – 1976) was an English footballer who played in the Football League for Bristol City, Bristol Rovers and Exeter City.

References

1895 births
1979 deaths
English footballers
Association football forwards
English Football League players
Bristol City F.C. players
Exeter City F.C. players
Bristol Rovers F.C. players
Bath City F.C. players